La Grande-4 Airport  is an airfield exclusively serving the La Grande-4 hydro-electric generating station in northern Quebec, Canada.

See also
 La Grande Rivière Airport
 La Grande-3 Airport
 La Grande-4/Lac de la Falaise Water Aerodrome
 James Bay Project

References

External links

James Bay Project
Registered aerodromes in Nord-du-Québec